Edward Deane  was an Irish politician.

Deane was born in Lymington and educated at  Trinity College, Dublin.

Deane  represented Inistioge from 1703 to 1717.

References

Irish MPs 1703–1713
Irish MPs 1713–1714
Irish MPs 1715–1727
Members of the Parliament of Ireland (pre-1801) for County Kilkenny constituencies
18th-century Irish people
Alumni of Trinity College Dublin
People from Lymington
1660 births
1717 deaths